Coleophora xyridella is a moth of the family Coleophoridae. It is found in the United States, including Louisiana, Mississippi, Florida, South Carolina and Georgia.

The larvae feed on the seed heads of Xyris species.

References

External links
Images
Coleophora xyridella – 1396.1 on Moth Photographers Group

xyridella
Moths of North America
Moths described in 2005